Plonk is an Australian comedy television series. Originally filmed as five online webisodes, they were re-edited to produce the first season of three broadcast episodes which aired on Eleven from 11 March 2014 to 25 March 2014. A second season of six half-hour episodes premiered on streaming service Stan in June 2015.

The satirical series follows the trials and tribulations of a television crew as they try to produce an engaging wine program. It stars Chris Taylor from The Chaser, Joshua Tyler and Nathan Earl playing fictional versions of themselves.

Cast

Main
 Chris Taylor
 Joshua Tyler
 Nathan Earl
 Glen Condie
 Georgie Lewin
 Angus Morton
 Susie Porter as Evelyn Tyler
 Steve Bisley as Ian Tyler

Guest
 Dan Ilic 
 Maggie Beer
 Matt Skinner
 Greg Eccleston as Doctor Monotone
 Greg Fleet
 Andrew Hansen
 Renee Lim as Lucy
 Jay Weatherill

Episodes

Season 1
Episode 1: Murrumbateman
Episode 2: Hunter Valley
Episode 3: Hunter Valley to Mudgee
Episode 4: Mudgee
Episode 5: Orange

Season 2
Episode 1: Adelaide Hills
Episode 2: Clare to Barossa
Episode 3: Barossa
Episode 4: McLaren Vale
Episode 5: Coonawarra
Episode 6: Adelaide

References

10 Peach original programming
Stan (service) original programming
Australian comedy television series
2014 Australian television series debuts
English-language television shows